The Houston Astros (formerly known as the Houston Colt .45s from 1962–1964) are a Major League Baseball franchise based in Houston, Texas. Formed in 1962, they play in the American League West division (formerly in the National League Central division until 2012). Pitchers for the Astros have thrown fifteen no-hitters in franchise history, the most of all of MLB's expansion teams added since 1961. A no-hitter is officially recognized by Major League Baseball only "when a pitcher (or pitchers) allows no hits during the entire course of a game, which consists of at least nine innings", though one or more batters "may reach base via a walk, an error, a hit by pitch, a passed ball or wild pitch on strike three, or catcher's interference". No-hitters of less than nine complete innings were previously recognized by the league as official; however, several rule alterations in 1991 changed the rule to its current form. No perfect games, a special subcategory of no-hitter, have been thrown in Astros history. As defined by Major League Baseball, "in a perfect game, no batter reaches any base during the course of the game."

Don Nottebart threw the first no-hitter in Astros history on May 17, 1963; the most recent no-hitter was a combined one thrown by Cristian Javier, Bryan Abreu, Rafael Montero, and Ryan Pressly on November 2, 2022. No left-handed starting pitchers have thrown no-hitters in franchise history. The longest interval between no-hitters was 12 years, 2 months and 10 days from the combined no-hitter led by Roy Oswalt on June 11, 2003, and that thrown by Fiers on August 21, 2015. The shortest interval was just 29 days from the combined no-hitter led by Sanchez on August 3, 2019, and Verlander's no-hitter on September 1. They no-hit the Cincinnati Reds, the Los Angeles Dodgers, and the Philadelphia Phillies the most, which occurred twice. There are three no-hitters in which the team allowed at least a run, by Nottebart in 1963, Johnson in 1964 (which was a 9-inning home loss), and Kile in 1993. The most baserunners allowed in a no-hitter was by Wilson (in 1969), who allowed eight. Ten no-hitters were thrown at home, and five on the road. The Astros have thrown two no-hitters in April, two in May, three in June, one in July, two in August, four in September, and one in November. Of the fifteen no-hitters, three have been won by a score of 2–0, more common than any other result. The largest margin of victory in a no-hitter was an 8–0 combined effort led by Oswalt in 2003. The smallest margin of victory was 2–0 wins by Wilson in 1967, Mike Scott in 1986, and Verlander in 2019.

The umpire is also an integral part of any no-hitter. The task of the umpire in a baseball game is to make any decision “which involves judgment, such as, but not limited to, whether a batted ball is fair or foul, whether a pitch is a strike or a ball, or whether a runner is safe or out… [the umpire’s judgment on such matters] is final.” Part of the duties of the umpire making calls at home plate includes defining the strike zone, which "is defined as that area over homeplate (sic) the upper limit of which is a horizontal line at the midpoint between the top of the shoulders and the top of the uniform pants, and the lower level is a line at the hollow beneath the kneecap." These calls define every baseball game and are therefore integral to the completion of any no-hitter. A different umpire presided over each of the franchise’s fifteen no-hitters.

The manager is another integral part of any no-hitter. The tasks of the manager include determining the starting rotation as well as batting order and defensive lineup every game. Eight different managers have involved in the franchise’s fifteen no-hitters.

List of no-hitters in Astros history

See also

 List of Major League Baseball no-hitters

References

No-hitters
Houston Astros